The Girl Guides Association of Namibia is the national Guiding organization of Namibia. It serves 1,124 members (as of 2003). Founded in 1923 as the Girl Guides Association of South-West Africa, the girls-only organization became a full member of the World Association of Girl Guides and Girl Scouts in 1993.

The Girl Guide emblem features the Welwitschia mirabilis.

See also
Scouts of Namibia

References 

World Association of Girl Guides and Girl Scouts member organizations
Scouting and Guiding in Namibia
Youth organizations established in 1923